Ivan Kuzmenko (born 7 April 1995) is a Russian swimmer. He competed in the men's 4 × 100 metre freestyle relay event at the 2018 European Aquatics Championships, winning the gold medal.

References

1995 births
Living people
Russian male swimmers
Place of birth missing (living people)
Russian male freestyle swimmers
European Aquatics Championships medalists in swimming
Universiade bronze medalists for Russia
Universiade medalists in swimming
Universiade silver medalists for Russia
Medalists at the 2015 Summer Universiade
Medalists at the 2019 Summer Universiade